The 1921 New York Brickley Giants season was their sole season in the American Professional Football Association (which would be renamed the National Football League in 1922). The team finished the season with a 0–2 league record, and tied for eighteenth place in the league. Overall, the team posted a 5–3 record, when taking non-league games into account. The team is also referred to as the Brooklyn Giants in contemporary advertising.

Schedule

Bold print designates league opponent

Standings

References

New York Brickley Giants seasons
New York Brickley Giants
New York Brickley Giants
National Football League winless seasons